Karmiotissa Polemidion FC (Karmiotissa Polemidion) is a Cypriot football club based in Pano Polemidia, Limassol. As of 2016 the team competed in the First Division for one season, where it played for the first time in its history, but was relegated. In 2022 they returned to the top flight. The club colors are red and white. The home ground of the football team is the Community Stadium of Pano Polemidia.

History
Karmiotissa was founded in 1979 and played  mostly in the championships of STOK. The club has appeared 2 times in national divisions in 1986–87 and 2009–10 and two times in the Fourth Division. The club's name comes from the chapel of Virgin Mary Karmiotissa located in Pano Polemidia. In 2009, Karmiotissa played in the championships of STOK and won its promotion to Cypriot Fourth Division by winning Enosi Neon Ypsona 4–0 in the last match, returning after years in the Cyprus Football Association's leagues. During the same season, Karmiotissa won the cup of STOK while lost 2–1 from THOI Monagriou in the final of the cup winners of STOK.

In the 2009–10 season, competing in the fourth division, the club finished in the 8th place of the league and gained its participation in the league for the next season. In the 2010–11 season, the club ranked 4th just only one point away from the third place which secures the promotion to the third division, achievement which succeeded following season by finishing in the second place of the league. The promotion to the third division followed the promotion to the second division, after Karmiotissa finished in the first place of the league and together conquered the championship. However, for the season 2013–14 it had been pre-decided to separate the second division into two groups, resulting Karmiotissa to participate in group B2, with B1 group being the next higher level and not the first division. For that season the club awarded from Cyprus Football Association as moral club in the Cypriot Third Division.

The next year, participating in B2 group, the club won the championship and the same time the participation in the B1 group. However, the CFA decided the consolidation of the two groups and the restoration of second Division in a single one for the season 2014–15. Karmiotissa ranked in the fifth place which is the highest in its history. In addition, the club reached the quarter finals of the Cypriot Cup 2014–15 in which eliminated from AC Omonia.

In 2021 ilya shirokov had 0 minutes

Players

Out on loan

Honours
 Cypriot Second Division
Champions: 2015–16, 2021–22
 Cypriot Third Division
Champions: 2012–13

References

External links
 Karmiotissa Official Page 
 CFA profile 
 Soccerway profile 

 
Football clubs in Cyprus
Association football clubs established in 1979
1979 establishments in Cyprus